The Battle of Sosnowiec was one of battles of the January Uprising. It took place in the night of 6–7 February 1863, between Polish insurgents under Colonel Apolinary Kurowski, and Imperial Russian Army garrison, which guarded the town of Sosnowiec, Congress Poland.

On 5 February 1863 Kurowski and his men left Ojców, and marched towards Olkusz. He had some 150 men, who were joined by additional 100, including cavalry, riflemen and kosynierzy. The unit spent the night at Olkusz, and in the morning of 6 February they marched westwards, to Sławków and then Maczki (now a district of Sosnowiec). At that time Maczki was a very important railroad station, located at the border of the Russian Empire and the Kingdom of Prussia.

The insurgents, assisted by rail workers and coal miners from Zagłębie Dąbrowskie, captured a train, and at 9 p.m. left Maczki, heading to Sosnowiec, via Dąbrowa Górnicza. At 2 a.m. on 7 February, insurgent infantry left the train near Sielec, marching to the Sosnowiec Main Station. Then they attacked Russian garrison, which manned the station and nearby custom house. After some time, the Russians fled either to Modrzejów, or towards the nearby Prussian border. The Poles then released 30 captured prisoners of war, but several joined the insurgents.

The insurgents seized 40 horses, weapons, and 97,000 roubles, sharing the money with Polish National Government. For the next two weeks, Poles controlled Sosnowiec and other areas of Zagłębie Dąbrowskie, with Polish banners hanging from administration buildings.

References

Sources 
 Stefan Kieniewicz: Powstanie styczniowe. Warszawa: Polish Scientific Publishers PWN, 1983. .

Battles of the January Uprising
Conflicts in 1863
February 1863 events
Battle of Sosnowiec